Future Weapons, sometimes also written as FutureWeapons and Futureweapons, is a television series that premiered on April 19, 2006, on the Discovery Channel. Host Richard "Mack" Machowicz, a former Navy SEAL, reviews and demonstrates the latest modern weaponry and military technology. The program is currently broadcast on the Discovery Channel and Military Channel (now American Heroes Channel).


Episode list

Season 1 (2006)

Season 2 (2007)

Season 3 (2007–2008)

See also
 Weaponology is another similar show broadcast on the Military Channel. Its first season focused on the history of weapons like the sniper rifle, submarines or tanks. Its second season dealt with elite units like the Navy SEALs, the SAS.
 Deadliest Warrior is a similar program in which information on historical or modern warriors and their weapons are used to determine which of them is the "deadliest" based upon tests performed during each episode. As of Season 3, Mack is one of the show's hosts.

External links
 
 

2006 American television series debuts
2008 American television series endings
Discovery Channel original programming
Television shows about weaponry
American Heroes Channel original programming